The ABU Song Festivals are non-competitive song concert galas based on the Eurovision Song Contest.  The format consists of two shows, a Radio Song Festival and TV Song Festival, organised by the Asia-Pacific Broadcasting Union (ABU).

Participating countries that have full or additional full ABU membership are invited to submit a song to be performed in front of a live audience.  The radio festival was a competitive show with a panel of judges determining the top-5 prize winners and is broadcast via live radio that later transitioned to a non-competitive gala format. The television festival which is a non-competitive, musical gala presentation, is live recorded so that each of the national broadcasters may add subtitles in their native languages.

History

Our Sound - The Asia-Pacific Song Contest

In 2008, the European Broadcasting Union (EBU) proposed a partnership with ABU on the establishment of an Asiavision Song Contest, however these talks didn't produce any result, and in September 2008 it was announced that the Eurovision Song Contest format for Asian production had been sold to a private company from Singapore, Asiavision Pte. Ltd. The original name intended for that event was Asiavision Song Contest, but it was later changed to Our Sound - The Asia-Pacific Song Contest following a request from the ABU, who uses the Asiavision name for their news exchange service. Initially, the contest (which was supposed to be a two programme live broadcast TV show with public voting) was set to premiere in 2009, but it was later rescheduled for March 2010 in Macau and then for November 2010 in Mumbai, at the end being postponed indefinitely "due to the ongoing issues between the organizers and EBU". As of now, it is still uncertain if there will ever be such a contest.

Development
The Asia-Pacific Broadcasting Union (ABU) had already run an international song contest for its members inspired by the Eurovision Song Contest in 1985 – 1987, called the ABU Popular Song Contest, with 14 countries of the Asia-Pacific region competing. The show had a similar concept to the current radio song festival with winners being chosen by a professional jury. South Korea, New Zealand and Australia celebrated victories in this competition. In 1989 – 1991 ABU co-produced the ABU Golden Kite World Song Festival in Malaysia with the participation of Asia-Pacific countries, as well as Yugoslavia and Finland.

Shortly before launching the ABU Song Festival, the ABU had been considering the possibility to organize the ABU ASEAN TV Song Festival in Thailand. Historically, ASEAN song contests had been organized in periods between 1981 and 1997, however since 2011 the ASEAN Festival had been organized between local Radio stations as Bintang Radio ASEAN.  The ABU outlined a plan about a "television song festival" based on the style of the Eurovision Song Contest following the cancellation of Our Sound. Kenny Kihyung Bae, chosen to the project manager, attended Eurovision Song Contest 2012 in Baku, Azerbaijan to learn more about the contest before putting it to work.

In November 2011, the ABU announced that they would organize its own TV and Radio Song Festivals to take place in Seoul, the South Korean capital, in time with 49th General Assembly in October 2012. The name Asiavision Song Contest was initially mentioned as a possibility, but they were later officially titled ABU TV Song Festival and ABU Radio Song Festival. According to the ABU, the deadline for participation applications for ABU TV Song Festival 2012 was 18 May 2012.

Format 
Andreas Gerlach, CEO of Asiavision Pte. Ltd, stated that "the format is highly suited to the Asia region and its people who love popular music and have a strong national pride. Asia today is all about competition, economically and politically. The Song Contest is a friendly competition between cultures. Like in Europe, the universal language of music will help to bring people closer together and nurture mutual understanding in the region."

The festivals are divided into two versions, ABU Radio Song Festival and ABU TV Song Festival.  Twenty-six songs from sixteen nations competed at the Radio Song Festival, held in the South Korean capital, Seoul on 14 October 2012, while seven nations competed in the ABU TV Song Festival.  Countries eligible to participate in both of the ABU Song Festivals must have full or additional full ABU or ASBU membership.

ABU Radio Song Festival

The ABU Radio Song Festival is a concert performance for musicians, who are not under contract with any label. The ABU recommends its members to introduce participating musicians and their songs on radio. Every participant is chosen by one national radio broadcaster. A jury represented by ABU members chooses 15 finalists from 26 submissions. The finalists perform during the general assembly of the ABU. Another jury awards the best artists.

Note 1:  Due to the demise of King Bhumibol Adulyadej, the 2017 ABU Radio Song Festival, initially scheduled to be held on 27 April 2017 as part of the 2017 RadioAsia Conference, will not be held in Thailand. The festival is cancelled

ABU TV Song Festival

The ABU TV Song Festival is a concert performance for professional musicians, who according to the organiser are well known in their country of origin. The event is not meant to be competitive. The festival will be recorded and is meant to be broadcast by participating ABU members first. Non-participating ABU members and non-ABU member broadcasters will be allowed to broadcast the festival for a fee at a later stage.  Every musician will be selected by a national broadcaster being member of the ABU. The participants perform during the general assembly of the ABU.

At a press conference held on 18 July 2013 it was announced that Indonesia were submitting a bid to host the ABU TV Song Festival 2015. In recent editions, the TV Festival has been held in the host city of the ABU General Assembly, with Istanbul, Turkey being the host to such assembly in 2015.  If the bid were to be successful it would be the first time that the TV Festival would have been taken place away from the host country of the General Assembly.

However, it was announced in August 2014 that Indonesia were making plans to host the ABU TV Song Festival 2016 instead. Turkey's début at the 2014 Festival had led to speculation that they were hosting the 2015 festival alongside the ABU General Assembly, which took place in Istanbul.  It was further confirmed in October 2014 that Turkey were indeed the hosts of the 2015 festival, which took place in Istanbul on 28 October 2015. Indonesia's hosting of the festival took place on 22 October 2016 in Bali.

ABU International Dance Festival
The ABU International Dance Festival will be a new event organised by the Asia-Pacific Broadcasting Union, with the début festival scheduled to take place in Hyderabad, India. The date was originally scheduled to take place in November 2016, But was later postponed and is now scheduled to take place on 12 to 15 January 2017. The festival was proposed by Prasar Bharati to be a contest.

ABU Song Contest
The ABU Song Contest is a competitive televised song contest that was first discussed in 2015 by the ABU, with the first contest having been planned to be held in 2017, which however did not take place that year. In August 2018, it was announced that the ABU has been in discussion with the Chinese national broadcaster to host the first edition. The host city would be Qingdao. The contest was originally due to be held from 17–19 October 2019 but was delayed to 16–18 April 2020 to allow for more time to prepare the contest. After China implementing entry ban of other countries during the COVID-19 pandemic on 28 March 2020, ABU is yet to announce the fate of the contest.

References

External links 

 ABU Official website
 ABU Radio Song Festival website
 ABU TV Song Festival website

 
Song contests
Music festivals established in 2012